Richard Kim (born 1981) is a Korean-American car designer, known for his work on the BMW i3 and i8 electric cars. He joined Canoo in 2017 as Chief Design Officer and Co-Founder.

Career
Kim obtained a degree in Transportation Design from Art Center College of Design in California in 2004 and later taught as a faculty instructor from 2008-15.

He has worked as a designer for BMW Designworks USA and BMW Project i in Munich from 2005 to 2012. He then worked at GM Hollywood and VW/Audi group Santa Monica and subsequently left in 2015 to join start-up car company Faraday Future which he left in December 2017. He worked at Faraday Future as VP of Design, Branding, UIUX, and Experiential.

Prior to working at BMW he spent time with Nissan Design Europe and VW Group in Simi Valley and Barcelona.

Notable designs
BMW X1 (E84) (exterior designer)
BMW i3 concept (exterior designer)
BMW i3 production
BMW i8 concept
BMW i8 Spyder
Faraday Future FFZER01 concept
Faraday Future FF 91
LeSee Pro concept
Canoo
Canoo MPDV
Canoo Pickup Truck

References

External links

Living people
American automobile designers
BMW designers
Art Center College of Design alumni
1981 births